Anthony "Tony" Franklin (born 18 December 1950) is a former Australian rules footballer who played with South Melbourne in the Victorian Football League (VFL) during the 1970s.

Originally from the Tasmanian club Penguin, Franklin played mostly as a ruckman and half forward in his two seasons at South Melbourne. His career was dogged by recurring hamstring injuries.

He represented Tasmania at interstate football and won the Lefroy Medal for a performance against Victoria.

After leaving South Melbourne he spent some time in the VFA playing for Sandringham. Franklin rejoined the Swans as a coach, guiding the Reserves team to the 1980 VFL Reserves Grand Final, where they lost by 33 points to Geelong. When the Swans relocated to Sydney in 1982, Franklin was appointed chairman of the match committee.

When Ricky Quade was suddenly admitted to hospital with a bleeding ulcer midway through the 1984 season, Franklin filled in as senior coach for Sydney's round 14 game against Collingwood, which they lost by 31 points. He later served as their Chairman of Selectors.

References

Tony Franklin's coaching record at AFL Tables
Holmesby, Russell and Main, Jim (2007). The Encyclopedia of AFL Footballers. 7th ed. Melbourne: Bas Publishing.

1950 births
Living people
Australian rules footballers from Tasmania
Sydney Swans players
Sydney Swans coaches
Sandringham Football Club players
Penguin Football Club players